The 1987–88 season of the Moroccan Throne Cup was the 32nd edition of the competition.

Maghreb de Fès won the cup, beating FAR de Rabat 4–2 on penalties after a 0–0 draw in the final, played at the Prince Moulay Abdellah Stadium in Rabat. Maghreb de Fès won the tournament for the second time in their history.

Competition

Last 16

Quarter-finals

Semi-finals

Final 
The final was played between the two winning semi-finalists, Maghreb de Fès and FAR de Rabat, on 11 September 1988 at the Prince Moulay Abdellah Stadium in Rabat.

Notes and references 

1987
1987 in association football
1988 in association football
1987–88 in Moroccan football